Rafiq Raaz (born 10 March 1950) is an Indian poet, broadcaster and the former director of All India Radio Srinagar. He primarily writes in Urdu and Kashmiri language.  He published his first book titled Nai Che Naalan (Flute is wailing) in 1978, leading him to become the recipient of Sahitya Akademi Award after the book was released to the general public in 1995. Consisting eighty-three ghazals and one qasida about Nund Rishi, it was later introduced to the Bachelor of Arts courses by the University of Kashmir.

He was among the other writers who helped improve Kashmiri literature in 1950s of what is now called modern Kashmiri literature. In 2015, he featured in Meet the Author Program focused on to promote Urdu and Persian languages in the region. It is organised by the University of Kashmir via its English department.

Early life and education 
He was born on 10 March 1950 in Srinagar, Jammu and Kashmir princely state, India (in modern-day Jammu and Kashmir union territory). He was ten years old when his father Khaja Ali Mohd Shamrock permanently relocated to Zaina Kadal and stayed there for over thirty-eight years until he relocated to Bagat Srinagar.

He attended schools in his hometown, and later he attended S. P. College for further studies. He obtained master's degree in Urdu language from the University of Kashmir. In 1975 and 1976, he started his PhD thesis at the same university.

He was later appointed to the post of lecturer at the department of Kashmiri where he taught until he was appointed as a programme executive at the All India Radio Srinagar, and by the latter served as director until he retired in 2010.

Career 
During his career, he wrote six books out of two such as Anhar and Nai Che Naalan consists of one hundred and eight-three ghazals and one qasida. He also wrote 50 to 60 radio plays broadcast by the Radio Kashmir, and has also used to host morning radio programs, including Zoon-e-Dab program, while some programs were aimed at to recite Āyahs (Quranic verses). He also wrote a patriotic song titled Ek Hai Bharat Shresth Bharat (There is no country like India) that was released on Republic Day by the All India Radio.

Publications

Awards and accordion

References 

1950 births
Living people
People from Srinagar
University of Kashmir alumni
Poets from Jammu and Kashmir
Recipients of the Sahitya Akademi Award in Kashmiri